Untamed World was a 1968–1976 TV wildlife series narrated by Phil Carey and Alan Small. It is probably remembered by many for its distinctive and interesting theme music. It is sometimes confused with another wildlife show from the era, Wild Kingdom.

Background
The show was originally broadcast on CTV and was changed to Untamed Frontier for a short time due to legal issues.
Phil Carey was the narrator for the show from 1968 to 1975. Alan Small had been involved with the show from the beginning. He was also a narrator for the show and was previously with CFRB. It was produced by Lawrence E. Neiman and Bud Weiser. Episodes covered different locations around the world, including focusing on flora and fauna.

Phil Carey died on 7 February 2009, aged 83.

Music
The theme music for the show was provided by Mort Garson.

Episodes

Season 1: 1968–1969

Season 2: 1969–1970

Untamed World Presents The Challenging Sea (Series 1)

Season 3: 1970–1971

Season 4: 1971–1972

Season 5: 1972–1973

Untamed World Presents The Challenging Sea (Series 2)

Season 6: 1973–1974

Season 7: 1974–1975

Season 8: 1975–1976

References

External links
 Imdb: Untamed World
  The Untamed World Music Intro
 The Untamed World Music Outro

Nature educational television series
1960s Canadian documentary television series
1970s Canadian documentary television series
Animal Planet original programming
English-language television shows
CTV Television Network original programming